Popular Democratic Union may refer to:

 Popular Democratic Union (Ecuador)
 Popular Democratic Union (El Salvador)
 Popular Democratic Union (Portugal)
 Popular Democratic Union (Yemen)
 People's Democratic Union (disambiguation)

 See also
 Popular Democratic Unity, a former political front in Peru.
 Democratic and Popular Union, a former political party in Bolivia.